Mohamed Mehrez (17 July 1935 – 17 June 2008) was an Egyptian sports shooter. He competed at the 1964 Summer Olympics and the 1968 Summer Olympics.

References

External links
 

1935 births
2008 deaths
Egyptian male sport shooters
Olympic shooters of Egypt
Shooters at the 1964 Summer Olympics
Shooters at the 1968 Summer Olympics
Sportspeople from Cairo